The Qumi (DPC74A1) is a pocket projector manufactured by Delta Electronics for vendor Vivitek. It was released in May 2011.

Description
The Qumi is the first portable, 3D, high definition, LED powered projector based on Texas Instruments' new 3D-Ready DLP Pico HD chipset and Luminus's Phlatlight PT-39 LED light source.

Features
 Native 1280×800 resolution
 Able to project up to 1920×1080, coupled with diamond-pixel compression, to produce a readable-text 1080p display
 Weight of 617 grams
 Consumes 53/17 watts in normal/eco mode
 Phlatlight based LED light source rated for an estimated 30,000 hours operation
 Brightness is 300 lumens, and at 60" diagonal image measurement was 198 lumens
 Built-in microSD card slot
 Remote control of the built-in media player

3D capability
Qumi has only HDMI 1.3, it is not HDCP compliant for 3D playback, 3D works only with PC via HDMI and analog VGA port, with DLP Link and IR glasses, in 800×600, 1024×768, 1280×720 (VGA only), at any 120Hz capable graphics card.

Supported resolutions
The Qumi can accept an input resolution up to: 
 1920×1080 at 60Hz, when using HDMI 
 1600×1200 at 60Hz when using VGA

Critiques
Users reported some issues with the Qumi. The unit requires between 5 and 15 minutes to focus at warm-up, likely because the new generation LED based portables have plastic lenses. The Qumi shipped without a required proprietary AV cable that can be ordered and shipped, for free, by contacting Vivitek. You can use a generic AV cable by reversing the RED and YELLOW inputs.  Red is video on the Qumi, not the industry standard yellow. The built-in speaker is quiet, and the 3D is described as usable only in dark situations (although this is a matter of opinion). Some customers have reported chromatic aberration issues, a defect which produces non-uniformly-focussed areas causing blurred lines and text, and in 3D mode 1280×720 at 120Hz the picture is blurred (less noticeable during movies).

Benefit of DLP+LED projectors 
The 300–500 lumens vivid LED-based DLP Pico 3D HD projectors, based on a DLP chip from Texas Instruments like the Qumi are the greenest standard in projector technology today and is described as a revolutionary audio-visual experience. It is ideal for mobile entertainment but also usable for computing tasks such as editing text, pair programming, general web-surfing, etc. The Qumi's high native resolution make using the projector as the sole display of a computer more desirable.

Compared to the traditional filament-based lamp designs, LED technology is
 smaller and cheaper
 more durable and ideal for continuous or rapid on-off usage, since LEDs do not require a cool-down period. 
 lasts a magnitude longer (30,000–50,000 hrs or more versus 6000, typical of modern lamps in "eco" mode)
 are maintenance-free
 and have significantly lower power consumption.

In addition, the benefits of DLP+LED technology versus LCD or LCOS using any light source are:
 DLP+LED systems are brighter, i.e. light is not "wasted" by being filtered to produce red, green and blue since LEDs produce those colors directly.
 being purer i.e. white light being filtered to red, green, and blue is not as accurate as an LED producing that color natively
 a larger, clearer image then is possible with an equivalently lumen-rated traditional projector.

By strobing the LEDs in sequence, the "color wheel" can be removed, making the new generation of DLP+LED projectors completely solid state, as well as reducing visual artifacts that put DLP at a disadvantage to LCD or LCOS, i.e. the "rainbow effect", in certain situations.

Finally, the diamond pixels used on the DLP projection system provide some unusual benefits/tradeoffs. In a nutshell, the diamond pixels make computer graphics at native resolution a more "grainy" (by a tiny amount) at native resolution but, at compressed resolutions,  better than compression on a square pixel grid. Movies displayed at native resolution have no noticeable difference, but movies at 1080p are exceptionally accurate (for not being "true" 1080p). When projecting a 1920×1080 sized computer graphical user interface (GUI), the text remains readable and is overall surprisingly faithful to what a full 1080p display would produce. The diamond pixel layout achieves this effect using a property of human vision and recognition similar in spirit, although not mathematically, to the psychoacoustics used to compress MP3's. No wobulation is used; this effect is purely enabled by the shape of the pixel.

References

External links 
 Official Website
 Vivitek

Projectors
Products introduced in 2011